Bruno Maçães is a Portuguese politician, consultant and author. He is a senior advisor at Flint Global, former Secretary of State for European Affairs in Portugal, and a columnist for the New Statesman. He is a Member of the European Council on Foreign Relations.

Education 
He studied at the University of Lisbon and Harvard University, where he wrote his doctoral dissertation under Harvey Mansfield.

Career 
His tenure as Secretary of State for European Affairs in Portugal took place during the country's financial crisis. In 2013 the main Greek newspaper wrote that he was very German in his economic views. He told an audience in London that Germany has a "hypocritical" view to trade negotiations. He was described by Wolfgang Munchau as "reinventing the wheel" after tabling a number of proposals for eurozone reform. In April 2014 he defended an energy pact between the United States and Europe to face the Russian threat. His strategy was to create an energy revolution and move Europe to the Atlantic. 

He left government in November 2015. He was decorated by the President of Romania.

He was a senior fellow at Carnegie Europe and the Hudson Institute.

He is the author of four books: Dawn of Eurasia: On the Trail of the New World Order, Belt and Road: A Chinese World Order, History Has Begun: The Birth of a New America, and Geopolitics for the End Time: From the Pandemic to the Climate Crisis.

His book The Dawn of Eurasia, published by Penguin in January 2018, argues that the distinction between Europe and Asia has disappeared. His argument is that it is increasingly difficult to draw a border between the two continents.  Tyler Cowen wrote that The Dawn of Eurasia was the best book he had read all year. In 2018 The Dawn of Eurasia was granted the international Ranald MacDonald Award.

His book History Has Begun describes a theory of virtualism. Malloy Owen wrote: “ Like Alexis de Tocqueville, Bruno Maçães is an aristocratic European traveler in search of the meaning of the New World.”

His book Geopolitics for the End Time was reviewed by Paul Krugman in the New York Review of Books.

He reports from Ukraine for the New Statesman. The main terms he introduced are Eurasia, virtualism, world building, and civilization state. In February 2023 he accused Megan Garber of the Atlantic of plagiarizing his work on fantasy in modern life.

References 

Year of birth missing (living people)
Living people
Harvard University alumni
Portuguese male writers
Portuguese political scientists
Portuguese politicians
Portuguese columnists